A continuous cooling transformation (CCT) phase diagram is often used when heat treating steel. These diagrams are used to represent which types of phase changes will occur in a material as it is cooled at different rates. These diagrams are often more useful than time-temperature-transformation diagrams because it is more convenient to cool materials at a certain rate (temperature-variable cooling), than to cool quickly and hold at a certain temperature (isothermal cooling).

Types of continuous cooling diagrams

There are two types of continuous cooling diagrams drawn for practical purposes.

 Type 1: This is the plot beginning with the transformation start point, cooling with a specific transformation fraction and ending with a transformation finish temperature for all products against transformation time for each cooling curve.
 Type 2: This is the plot beginning with the transformation start point, cooling with specific transformation fraction and ending with a transformation finish temperature for all products against cooling rate or bar diameter of the specimen for each type of cooling medium..

See also

 Isothermal transformation
 Phase diagram

References

Diagrams
Phase transitions
Metallurgy